Katherine Collins is a writer.

Katherine Collins (or variants) may also refer to:

Catherine Collins, fictional character in Bunty
Catherine Collins, fictional character in Six Feet Under played by Harriet Sansom Harris

See also
Kate Collins (disambiguation)